Delhi Cantonment railway station (also known as Delhi Cantt. railway station) is a railway station in Delhi Cantonment, India. The station code is DEC.

History

This station started as a metre-gauge railway station. After the 1991 gauge conversion it changed to broad gauge.

Trains
The most popular trains are the Royal Orient and DEE-BGKT Express.

Some of the other trains that stop at Delhi Cantonment railway station are:

 Jaipur–Delhi Sarai Rohilla AC Double Decker Express
 Delhi Sarai Rohilla–Bandra Terminus Garib Rath Express
 Ajmer–Hazrat Nizamuddin Jan Shatabdi Express
 Swarna Jayanti Rajdhani Express
 Chetak Express
 Rajasthan Sampark Kranti Express
 Ajmer–Delhi Sarai Rohilla Jan Shatabdi Express
Udaipur City–Delhi Sarai Rohilla Rajasthan Humsafar Express
 Ala Hazrat Express (via Ahmedabad) 
 Ala Hazrat Express (via Bhildi)
 Delhi Sarai Rohilla Sikar Express (via Jhunjhunu)

References

Railway stations in South West Delhi district
Delhi railway division
Year of establishment missing